The Mogalakwena River is one of the main watercourses in Limpopo Province, South Africa. It is also a major tributary of the Limpopo River.

Course

This river flows from the eastern side of the Waterberg Massif northeastwards through a wide flooded plain as the Nyl River. After about 80 km it starts bending northwards and its name changes to Mogalakwena. Then it flows across Limpopo Province until it joins the right bank of the Limpopo River at the South Africa/Botswana border.

The basin of the Mogalakwena is affected by a five-year rain cycle in which the river is virtually dry for five years, followed by another five years in which there is sufficient water flow. In 2016 the river had the least water in living memory, and villagers at Bokwidi had to dig in the sand to find water for their livestock.

There are 8 dams in the Mogalakwena basin. The highest concentration of hippopotamus in the Limpopo River is found between the Mokolo and the Mogalakwena Rivers.

Tributaries

The upper or southernmost stretch of the Mogalakwena River is the Nyl River, known for its wide flood-plain, also known as the Nyl pan. The flood-plain is partially conserved in the Nylsvley Nature Reserve, and incorporates one of the largest single ecosystems in South Africa for aquatic birds.

The Mothlakole, Dorps, Rooisloot (right), Groot Sandsloot (right), Witrivier (right), Sterk (left), Mokamolo (left), Little Magalakwena (left), Matlalane (right), Seepabana (right), Ga-Mamoleka (right), Pholotsi and Thwathwe are some of the tributaries of the Mogalakwena.

Dams in the basin
Glen Alpine Dam
Doorndraai Dam, in the Sterk River
Combrink Dam, in the Dorps River
Donkerpoort Dam, in the Klein Nyl River

Ethnic groups
The Ndebele people constitute the largest ethnic group in the catchment of the river, followed by the Pedi and Tsonga people. The Kattea, a little-known nomadic people akin to the San, used to live in the lands alongside the lower Mogalakwena. By 1905 however, they had been reduced to a few hundred individuals.

See also 
Mogalakwena Local Municipality
Drainage basin A
 List of rivers of South Africa
 List of reservoirs and dams in South Africa

References

External links
Study to determine mine-linked water needs nears completion
Limpopo River Basin - SARDC
ZA007 Nyl river flood-plain

 
Rivers of Limpopo
Tributaries of the Limpopo River